Radio Teemaneng Stereo 89.1 FM is a South African community radio station based in the Northern Cape.

Coverage Areas & Frequencies 
Kimberley
Warrenton
Kuruman
The borders of the Free State

Broadcast Languages
English
Afrikaans
Xhosa
Tswana

Broadcast Time
24/7

Target Audience
LSM Groups 1 – 8
Age Group 16 – 49
The Black Community

Programme Format
65% Music
35% Talk

Listenership Figures

References

External links
SAARF Website
Sentech Website
Radio Teemaneng Stereo FM Website

Community radio stations in South Africa
Mass media in the Northern Cape